Stage or stages may refer to:

Acting 
 Stage (theatre), a space for the performance of theatrical productions
 Theatre, a branch of the performing arts, often referred to as "the stage"
 The Stage, a weekly British theatre newspaper
 Stages Repertory Theatre, a theatre company in Houston, Texas

Music 
 Stage, an American band featuring Ryan Star
 Stage, a 2002 book and DVD documenting Britney Spears' Dream Within a Dream Tour
 Stage, Iranian television reality music competition

Albums
 Stage (David Bowie album), 1978
 Stage (Great White album), 1995
 Stage (Keller Williams album), 2004
 Stage, by Mónica Naranjo, 2009
 The Stage (album), by Avenged Sevenfold, or the title song (see below), 2016
 Stages (Cassadee Pope album), 2019
 Stages (Elaine Paige album), 1983
 Stages (Eric Clapton album), 1993
 Stages (Jimi Hendrix album), 1991
 Stages (Josh Groban album), 2015
 Stages (Melanie C album), 2012
 Stages (Triumph album), 1985
 Stages (Vedera album), 2009
 Stages: The Lost Album, by Eric Andersen, 1991
 Stages: Performances 1970–2002, by Neil Diamond, 2003
 Stages, by David Benoit, 1982
 Stages, by the Electric Soft Parade, 2020
 Stages, by Ella Koon, 2008
 Stages, by Jill Vidal, 2022

Songs
 "Stage", by Live from Throwing Copper, 1994
 "The Stage" (song), by Avenged Sevenfold, 2016
 "Stages" (song), by ZZ Top, 1986
 "Stages", by Reks from Grey Hairs, 2008

People with the surname 
 Ruth Stage, British artist
 Wm. Stage (born 1951), American journalist, writer and photographer

Transport 
 Stagecoach
 Stage, a type of limousine
 Linear stage, a component of precise motion system

Other uses 
 Special stage (rallying), in rally racing
 Stage (film), a 1951 Bollywood film
 Stage (stratigraphy), a set of rock strata with the same age
 The Stage (Antarctica), a moraine in Antarctica
 The Stage, Shoreditch, a  mixed-use development
 Staging (pathology) or cancer staging
 Stage (bicycle race), a leg in a bicycle race
 Stage (cooking), a period of work experience in a kitchen
 Stage Stores Inc., an American department store company
 Stage, auxiliary breathing gas cylinder used in scuba diving 
 Level (video gaming) 
 Stage (stream gauge), a measurement of water level in a river, stream, pond, lake, or estuary
 Stage, or apprenticeship
 Stage, the training programme of the European Commission in Brussels and Luxembourg
 Stages on Life's Way, an 1845 philosophical work by the Danish philosopher Søren Kierkegaard
 Calligra Stage, a presentation program
 S.T.A.G.E., the Scientists, Technologists and Artists Generating Exploration program at the University of California, Santa Barbara
 The platform and that supports a slide in an optical microscope
 Stage (hydrology)

See also 
 Condition (disambiguation)
 Developmental stage theories
 Feeling
 Multistage rocket
 Period (disambiguation)
 Phase (disambiguation)
 Social role

nl:Podium